Allende is a genus of South American long-jawed orb-weavers that was first described by F. Álvarez-Padilla in 2007.

Species
 it contains four species, found in Argentina and Chile:
Allende longipes (Nicolet, 1849) – Chile, Argentina
Allende nigrohumeralis (F. O. Pickard-Cambridge, 1899) – Chile (Juan Fernandez Is., mainland), Chile, Argentina
Allende patagiatus (Simon, 1901) – Chile, Argentina
Allende puyehuensis Álvarez-Padilla, 2007 (type) – Chile

In synonymy:
A. aurora (Simon, 1901) = Allende longipes (Nicolet, 1849)
A. chilensis (Tullgren, 1902) = Allende longipes (Nicolet, 1849)
A. cordillera (Tullgren, 1902) = Allende longipes (Nicolet, 1849)
A. echinatus (Tullgren, 1902) = Allende patagiatus (Simon, 1901)
A. porteri (Simon, 1900) = Allende nigrohumeralis (F. O. Pickard-Cambridge, 1899)
A. tortus (Tullgren, 1902) = Allende longipes (Nicolet, 1849)

See also
 List of Tetragnathidae species

References

Araneomorphae genera
Tetragnathidae